The 2020 Western Athletic Conference women's soccer tournament, delayed due to COVID-19 until Spring, 2021, was the postseason women's soccer tournament for the Western Athletic Conference held from April 13 to April 17, 2021. The five match tournament took place at GCU Stadium in Phoenix, AZ on the campus of Grand Canyon University. The six-team single-elimination tournament consisted of three rounds based on seeding from regular season conference play. The No. 1 seed Utah Valley defeated No. 2 seed Seattle Redhawks 1–0 in the final.

Bracket

Source:

All-Tournament team

Source:

MVP in bold

References 

Western Athletic Conference women's soccer seasons
tournament 2020-21
Western Athletic Conference Women's Soccer